Koreyt-e Borumi (also Romanized as Koreyt-e Borūmī; also known as Karet, Koreyt, Koreyt-e Do, and Qarait) is a village in Mosharrahat Rural District, in the Central District of Ahvaz County, Khuzestan Province, Iran. At the 2006 census, its population was 2,185, in 432 families.

References 

Populated places in Ahvaz County